Margaret Lorraine "Margalo" Gillmore (31 May 1897 – 30 June 1986) was an English-born American actress who had a long career as a stage actress on Broadway. She also appeared in films and TV series, mostly in the 1950s and early 1960s.

Family
Gillmore was the daughter of Frank Gillmore, a founder and former president of Actors' Equity, and the actress Laura MacGillivray, and the sister of actress Ruth Gillmore. Her great-aunt was the British actor-manager Sarah Thorne, and her great-uncles were the actors Thomas Thorne and George Thorne.

Career
A fourth-generation actor on her father's side, Gillmore trained at the American Academy of Dramatic Arts. Her stage acting career stretched from The Scrap of Paper in 1917 through to Noël Coward's musical Sail Away on Broadway in 1961. She was first noticed by the critics in the 1919 play The Famous Mrs. Fair, in which she appeared with Henry Miller and Blanche Bates. In 1921 she played the tubercular patient Eileen Carmody in Eugene O'Neill's The Straw, and in 1922 she portrayed Consuelo in the United States premiere of Leonid Andreyev's He Who Gets Slapped. In 1936, she originated the role of Mary Haines in Clare Boothe Luce's play The Women, and in 1945 she originated the role of Kay Thorndike in the Pulitzer Prize-winning play State of the Union. Gillmore appeared regularly with the Theatre Guild.

Having appeared as an extra in a silent film for the Vitagraph Studios in 1913, aged 16, and in a short, The Home Girl in 1928, Gillmore made her sound-film debut in 1932 in Wayward, but did not appear on screen again until the 1950s in such films as Perfect Strangers (1950), Cause for Alarm! (1951), Woman's World (1954), High Society (1956) and Upstairs and Downstairs (1959).

During World War II, Gillmore had a role in the traveling production of The Barretts of Wimpole Street. The production starred much of the original Broadway cast headed by leading actress Katharine Cornell, and directed by Cornell's husband Guthrie McClintic. The play entertained troops in Italy, France and England and reached within a few miles of the front in the Netherlands. The cast made a point of visiting military hospitals every day.

Gillmore played Mrs. Darling in the Broadway and televised versions of Peter Pan starring Mary Martin. She was a member of the famous Algonquin Round Table.

In 1964 she wrote her autobiography Four Flights Up, published by Houghton Mifflin.

Death
On 30 June 1986, Gillmore died of cancer, aged 89, in her New York City apartment.

Filmography

References

External links

 
 

1897 births
1986 deaths
Actresses from London
American film actresses
American stage actresses
American television actresses
20th-century American actresses
British emigrants to the United States
Deaths from cancer in New York (state)
Actresses from New York City
American Academy of Dramatic Arts alumni
Algonquin Round Table
20th-century English women
20th-century English people